Clinus nematopterus, the Chinese klipfish, that occurs in subtropical waters of the Atlantic Ocean where, despite its common name, it is endemic to South Africa, the common name having derived from a locality error in the original description.  This species can reach a maximum length of  TL. This species feeds on benthic crustaceans (amphipods, isopods, ostracods) and also takes other fishes.

References

nematopterus
Fish described in 1861
Taxa named by Albert Günther
Fish of South Africa